The 1999 Valencian regional election was held on Sunday, 13 June 1999 to elect the 5th Corts of the Valencian Community. All 89 seats in the Corts were up for election. The election was held simultaneously with regional elections in twelve other autonomous communities and local elections all throughout Spain, as well as the 1999 European Parliament election.

The People's Party (PP), which had ruled the community from 1995 in a coalition government, won an absolute majority of seats; a majority which it would maintain for the next 20 years. Its coalition partner, the Valencian Union (UV), fell just below the 5% threshold, resulting in it losing all seats and being expelled from the Courts. The Spanish Socialist Workers' Party (PSOE) remained static on its 1995 vote share, though it gained 3 additional seats thanks to United Left (IU) electoral collapse from 10 to 5 seats.

Overview

Electoral system
The Corts Valencianes were the devolved unicameral legislature of the Valencian autonomous community, having legislative power in regional matters as defined by the Spanish Constitution and the Valencian Statute of Autonomy, as well as the ability to vote confidence in or withdraw it from a regional president.

Voting for the Corts was on the basis of universal suffrage, which comprised all nationals over 18 years of age, registered in the Valencian Community and in full enjoyment of their political rights. The 89 members of the Corts Valencianes were elected using the D'Hondt method and a closed list proportional representation, with a threshold of five percent of valid votes—which included blank ballots—being applied regionally. Parties not reaching the threshold were not taken into consideration for seat distribution. Seats were allocated to constituencies, corresponding to the provinces of Alicante, Castellón and Valencia, with each being allocated an initial minimum of 20 seats and the remaining 29 being distributed in proportion to their populations (provided that the seat-to-population ratio in any given province did not exceed three times that of any other).

The electoral law provided that parties, federations, coalitions and groupings of electors were allowed to present lists of candidates. However, groupings of electors were required to secure the signature of at least 1 percent of the electors registered in the constituency for which they sought election. Electors were barred from signing for more than one list of candidates. Concurrently, parties and federations intending to enter in coalition to take part jointly at an election were required to inform the relevant Electoral Commission within ten days of the election being called.

Election date
The term of the Corts Valencianes expired four years after the date of their previous election, with elections to the Corts being fixed for the fourth Sunday of May every four years. Legal amendments introduced in 1998 allowed for these to be held together with European Parliament elections, provided that they were scheduled for within a four month-timespan. The previous election was held on 28 May 1995, setting the election date for the Corts concurrently with a European Parliament election on Sunday, 13 June 1999.

The Corts Valencianes could not be dissolved before the date of expiry of parliament.

Opinion polls
The table below lists voting intention estimates in reverse chronological order, showing the most recent first and using the dates when the survey fieldwork was done, as opposed to the date of publication. Where the fieldwork dates are unknown, the date of publication is given instead. The highest percentage figure in each polling survey is displayed with its background shaded in the leading party's colour. If a tie ensues, this is applied to the figures with the highest percentages. The "Lead" column on the right shows the percentage-point difference between the parties with the highest percentages in a poll. When available, seat projections determined by the polling organisations are displayed below (or in place of) the percentages in a smaller font; 45 seats were required for an absolute majority in the Corts Valencianes.

Results

Overall

Distribution by constituency

Aftermath

Government formation

2002 investiture

References
Opinion poll sources

Other

1999 in the Valencian Community
Valencian Community
Regional elections in the Valencian Community
June 1999 events in Europe